Ligyra tantalus is a species of insect in the Bombyliidae family, commonly known as bee flies. It has an orange and brown thorax and a black abdomen with a white ring and four spots on it, although the rearmost two spots can be joined together in some specimens. The wings are purplish-black and swept back from the body when at rest.

Distribution
It is found in Asia in areas such as China (mainland) and Hong Kong, Indonesia, Japan, the Philippines (Palawan), Taiwan, and Thailand and also in Australia.

References

External links
 
 
 

Bombyliidae
Diptera of Asia
Insects described in 1794